Tech Town is a  district developed in downtown Dayton, Ohio, that is located near Fifth Third Field. Tech Town was one of ten "brownfields" in the Dayton area, and is designed to attract technology-based firms to Dayton and revitalize the downtown area. Tech Town's first major lab was opened in September 2009. Tech Town will be a mixed-use development to promote the creation of a mixed use neighborhood (single use campus) that supports/leverages the functions of daily life: employment, recreation, retail, civic and educational opportunities.

References

External links 
 Dayton Tech Town
 http://www.rfidnews.org/2009/09/01/dayton-opens-first-tech-town-building

Geography of Dayton, Ohio
Buildings and structures in Dayton, Ohio